Pottstown Area Rapid Transit (PART) is a public transit agency providing bus service in the Pottstown, Pennsylvania, area. It is owned by the borough of Pottstown and runs Monday through Saturday, excluding major holidays. PART provides a connection to SEPTA's Route 93 bus, which runs from Pottstown to Norristown. In addition to fixed routes, the agency also operates a paratransit service for disabled people.

Routes
All of PART's routes are loop routes that originate and terminate at the Charles W. Dickinson Transportation Center located at the intersection of High Street and Hanover Street in downtown Pottstown.

Fares

The base fare to ride on PART buses is $2.25, which must be paid in cash with exact change. A discounted fare of $1.10 is available for students with a valid ID. Persons with disabilities and Medicare Card holders may ride PART for $1.10 with a valid half-fare card. Senior citizens who are age 65 or older may ride PART for free with a valid Transit ID or Medicare Card. Up to two children under fare box height can ride for free with a fare-paying adult; additional children may ride for $0.25 each. Transfers between routes are available for $0.75 and must be used within 90 minutes of being purchased.

PART offers Multi-Ride and Round-Trip passes that can be purchased at Pottstown borough hall. The Multi-Ride Pass costs $22.50 for full-fare, $11.00 for half-fare, and $7.50 for transfer. The Round-Trip Pass costs $4.50 for full-fare, $2.20 for half-fare, and $1.50 for transfer.

The fare for PART's paratransit service is $4.50.

Fleet

Current

References

External links

Official website

Bus transportation in Pennsylvania
Transportation in Chester County, Pennsylvania
Transportation in Montgomery County, Pennsylvania